A Barton's fracture is a type of wrist injury where there is a broken bone associated with a dislocated bone in the wrist, typically occurring after falling on top of a bent wrist. It is an intra-articular fracture of the distal radius with dislocation of the radiocarpal joint.

There exist two types of Barton's fracture – dorsal and palmar, the latter being more common. The Barton's fracture is caused by a fall on an extended and pronated wrist increasing carpal compression force on the dorsal rim. Intra-articular component distinguishes this fracture from a Smith's or a Colles' fracture.
Treatment of this fracture is usually done by open reduction and internal fixation with a plate and screws, but occasionally the fracture can be treated conservatively.

Eponym
It is named after John Rhea Barton (1794–1871), an American surgeon who first described this in 1838.

Additional images

References

External links
 

Bone fractures